Peraküla may refer to several places in Estonia:

Peraküla, Lääne County, village in Lääne-Nigula Parish, Lääne County
Peraküla, Võru County, village in Võru Parish, Võru County